Claude Lucas (born 30 October 1943, in La Baule-Escoublac) is a French writer.

Biography 
Claude Lucas grew up in Saint-Malo. During his life he experienced numerous prison experiences, especially in Spain, which he evoked in 1995 in his novel Suerte (Prix France Culture the next year).

He lives on the île d'Ouessant in Brittany.

Works 
1993:  L'Hypothèse de M. Baltimore, theatre, Aléas Éditeur.
1995: Suerte, novel, Plon - Prix France Culture 1996
1998: Chemin des fleurs followed by Désert, short stories, Flammarion
2008: Amor mío, correspondence, éditions Jacqueline Chambon
2010: Ti kreiz, novel, 
2015: Une-certaine-absence@gmel.ie, novel, P.O.L

References

External links 
 Claude Lucas : « Je n’ai jamais cru à mon personnage de braqueur » on Libération (11 February 2015)
 Petit braqueur, grande plume. Jugé pour deux hold-up, Claude Lucas est devenu écrivain en prison on Libération (6 December 1996)
 Claude Lucas on Éditions P.O.L
 Le braqueur désarmé on Le Figaro (2 May 2008)
 Claude Lucas on France Culture
 Claude Lucas on YouTube

People from Loire-Atlantique
1943 births
20th-century French non-fiction writers
21st-century French non-fiction writers
Prix France Culture winners
Living people